Venezuela competed at the 1964 Summer Olympics in Tokyo, Japan. 16 competitors, 15 men and 1 woman, took part in 16 events in 5 sports.

Athletics

Arquímedes Herrera
Rafael Romero
Hortensio Fucil
Lloyd Murad
Héctor Thomas
Víctor Maldonado

Judo

Jorge Lugo

Sailing

Francisco Danisis
Juan Karsten
Halblaud Karsten
Daniel Camejo Octavio

Shooting

Four shooters represented Venezuela in 1964.

25 m pistol
 José-Antonio Chalbaud

50 m pistol
 Edgar Espinoza

50 m rifle, prone
 Enrico Forcella
 Agustin Rangel

Swimming

Teodoro Capriles
Annelisse Rockenbach

References

External links
Official Olympic Reports

Nations at the 1964 Summer Olympics
1964
1964 in Venezuelan sport